The Colombian Institute of Anthropology and History, ICANH, is a scientific and technical government agency ascribed to the Ministry of Culture in charge of researching, producing and disseminating knowledge in the fields of anthropology, archeology and colonial history to protect the archaeological and ethnographic patrimony of Colombia.

History
The National Archaeological Service was founded in 1938 in Colombia. In 1941, the National Ethnological Institute was founded by Paul Rivet. President Eduardo Santos Montejo invited Rivet to come from France to establish an academic teaching institute, which would formalize anthropological studies in the country. The institute was to be founded on scientific principals to investigate and analyze the diverse ethnic groups of Colombia. In 1952, the two organizations were merged, to form the Colombian Institute of Anthropology under the Ministry of Education. One year previously, the Colombian Institute of Hispanic Culture had been formed to preserve the Spanish culture of Colombia. In 1999, this organization was merged with the Colombian Institute of Anthropology to form the present entity.

See also 
 List of Muisca research institutes

References 

Ministry of Culture (Colombia)
History of Colombia
Government agencies established in 1999
Anthropological research institutes
History institutes
1999 establishments in Colombia